Pál Lázár (born 11 March 1988) is a Hungarian former football player.

Club statistics

Updated to games played as of 7 April 2018.

External links
 Profile at magyarfutball.hu
 Profile
 

1988 births
Living people
Sportspeople from Debrecen
Romanian sportspeople of Hungarian descent
Hungarian footballers
Romanian footballers
Association football defenders
Nemzeti Bajnokság I players
Süper Lig players
FC Sopron players
CF Liberty Oradea players
Fehérvár FC players
Samsunspor footballers
Pécsi MFC players
Debreceni VSC players
Diósgyőri VTK players
Mezőkövesdi SE footballers
Hungarian expatriate footballers
Expatriate footballers in Romania
Expatriate footballers in Turkey
Hungarian expatriate sportspeople in Romania
Hungarian expatriate sportspeople in Turkey
Hungary international footballers
Hungary under-21 international footballers